Scott Bellavance (born 7 July 1975) is a Canadian freestyle skier. He was born in Prince George, British Columbia. He competed at the 2002 Winter Olympics in Salt Lake City, where he placed sixth in men's moguls.

References

External links

1975 births
Living people
Sportspeople from Prince George, British Columbia
Freestyle skiers at the 2002 Winter Olympics
Canadian male freestyle skiers
Olympic freestyle skiers of Canada